Al-Taqadom FC is a Saudi Arabian football (soccer) team in Al-Qasim playing at the Saudi Third Division.

Stadium

Current squad 
As of Saudi Second Division:

References

Taqadom
Football clubs in Al Mithnab
Taqadom
Taqadom